The economy of Mauritius is a mixed developing economy based on agriculture, exports, financial services, and tourism. Since the 1980s, the government of Mauritius has sought to diversify the country's economy beyond its dependence on just agriculture, particularly sugar production.

Overview

In 1961, Professor James Meade painted a bleak picture of the economic prospects of Mauritius, which then had a population of 650,000. All the disadvantages associated with smallness of island states weighed heavily in his conviction that Mauritius was caught in a Malthusian trap and, therefore, if economic progress could at all be achieved, it would be to a very limited extent.  Since independence in 1968, Mauritius has developed from a low-income, agriculturally based economy to an upper-middle income diversified economy with growing industrial, financial, ICT and tourist sectors. For most of the period, annual growth has been roughly 4%. This compares very favorably with other sub-Saharan African countries and is largely due to sustained progress in economic conditions; between 1977 and 2008, growth averaged 4.6% compared with a 2.9% average in sub-Saharan Africa. Also important is that it has achieved what few fast growing economies achieve, a more equitable income distribution and inequality (as measured by the Gini coefficient) fell from 45.7 to 38.9 between 1980 and 2006. This remarkable achievement has been reflected in increased life expectancy, lowered infant mortality, and a much-improved infrastructure. Sugarcane is grown on about 90% of the cultivated land area and accounts for 25% of export earnings. The government's development strategy centers on expanding local financial institutions and building a domestic information telecommunications industry. Mauritius has attracted more than 9,000 offshore entities, many aimed at commerce in India and South Africa, and investment in the banking sector alone has reached over $1 billion. Mauritius, with its strong textile sector, has been well poised to take advantage of the Africa Growth and Opportunity Act (AGOA).

Mauritius has attracted US$10.98 billion in Foreign direct investment inflows. Top sectors attracting FDI inflows from Mauritius (from January 2000 to December, 2005) are electrical equipment, telecommunications, fuels, cement and gypsum products and services sector (financial and non-financial). 

With a well-developed legal and commercial infrastructure and a tradition of entrepreneurship and representative government, Mauritius is one of the developing world's most successful democracies. The economy has shown a considerable degree of resilience, and an environment already conducive to dynamic entrepreneurial activity has moved further toward economic freedom. The island's institutional advantages are noticeable. A transparent and well-defined investment code and legal system have made the foreign investment climate in Mauritius one of the best in the region. Taxation is competitive and efficient. The economy is increasingly diversified, with significant private-sector activity in sugar, tourism, economic processing zones, and financial services, particularly in offshore enterprises. The government is trying to modernize the sugar and textile industries, which in the past were overly dependent on trade preferences, while promoting diversification into such areas as information and communications technology, financial and business services, seafood processing and exports, and free trade zones. Agriculture and industry have become less important to the economy, and services, especially tourism, accounted for over 72 percent of GDP. The government still owns utilities and controls imports of rice, flour, petroleum products, and cement.

History 
The Mauritian economy has undergone remarkable transformations since independence. From a poor country with high unemployment exporting mainly sugar and buffeted by the vagaries of world demand, Mauritius has become relatively prosperous and diverse, although not without problems.

The 1970s were marked by a strong government commitment to diversify the economy and to provide more high-paying jobs to the population. The promotion of tourism and the creation of the EPZs did much to attain these goals. Between 1971 and 1977, about 64,000 jobs were created. However, in the rush to make work, the government allowed EPZ firms to deny their workers fair wages, the right to organize and strike, and the health and social benefits afforded other Mauritian workers. The boom in the mid-1970s was also fueled by increased foreign aid and exceptional sugar crops, coupled with high world prices.

The economic situation deteriorated in the late 1970s. Petroleum prices rose, the sugar boom ended, and the balance of payments deficit steadily rose as imports outpaced exports; by 1979 the deficit amounted to a staggering US$111 million. Mauritius approached the IMF and the World Bank for assistance. In exchange for loans and credits to help pay for imports, the government agreed to institute certain measures, including cutting food subsidies, devaluing the currency, and limiting government wage increases.

By the 1980s, thanks to a widespread political consensus on broad policy measures, the economy experienced steady growth, declining inflation, high employment, and increased domestic savings. The EPZ with investment principally from China, Hong Kong and Taiwan, and came into its own, surpassing sugar as the principal export-earning sector and employing more workers than the sugar industry and the government combined, previously the two largest employers. In 1986 Mauritius had its first trade surplus in twelve years. Tourism also boomed, with a concomitant expansion in the number of hotel beds and air flights. An aura of optimism accompanied the country's economic success and prompted comparisons with other Asian countries that had dynamic economies, including Hong Kong, Singapore, Taiwan, and South Korea.

The economy had slowed down by the late 1980s and early 1990s, but the government was optimistic that it could ensure the long-term prosperity of the country by drawing up and implementing prudent development plans. A stock exchange opened in Port Louis in 1989. As of 1993, Mauritius had a gross domestic product (GDP) estimated at US$8.6 billion, with a growth rate of 5.5 percent, and an inflation rate of 10.5 percent.

Policies for success 
Recent reports on progress on the Millennium Development Goals by the Overseas Development Institute indicated four key reasons for economic success.
 Heterodox liberalisation and diversification
 Concerted strategy of nation building
 Strong and inclusive institutions
 High levels of equitable public investment

Heterodox liberalisation and diversification 

Mauritius has followed a pragmatic development strategy in which liberalisation process was sequenced and tailored to its competitive advantages and weaknesses. The export-orientated approach has encouraged liberalisation supported by strong state involvement as a facilitator (of the enabling environment for the private sector); as operator (to encourage competition); and as regulator (to protect the economy as well as vulnerable groups and sectors from shocks). Strategies were evidence-based and adapted according to results. There has been consistency and stability, regardless of which political party is in power.

Liberalisation occurred in phases that were initiated to build on advantages the economy enjoyed on the international market. 
 1970s: Mauritius profited from sugar rents, established an export processing zone EPZ and successfully attracted capital and foreign investment in manufacturing, from China, Hong Kong and Taiwan.
 1980s–1990s: EPZ expanded and led to a significant increase in foreign direct investment (FDI) and tourism. Preferential access to sugar and clothing markets amounted to 7% of GDP in the 1980s and 4.5% in the 1990s, capital and current accounts were liberalised, contributing to an investment and employment boom and the high inflow of FDI brought with it managerial skills.
 1990s–2010: Further diversification, liberalisation and investment as Chinese investors left to pursue investments in Africa and China.

Concerted strategy of nation building 
A concerted strategy of nation building since Independence created the foundations for sustained growth. Partnerships across ethnic groups allowed economic redistribution to be negotiated and the resulting better balance of economic and political power allowed strong and independent institutions.  The emerging political system encouraged a consultative approach to policy formation that allowed strategies for growth to be continued regardless of changes in the parties in power.

Strong and inclusive institutions 
Strong institutions are critical in ensuring country's competitiveness, economic resilience and stability. They have supported development strategies and ensured that export earnings are reinvested in strategic and productive sectors. In the financial sector they have built a regulated and well-capitalised banking and financial system that protected it from toxic assets prior to the 2008 global financial crisis.

Corruption laws
In 2002, the government adopted the Prevention of Corruption Act, which led to the setting up of an Independent Commission Against Corruption (ICAC) a few months later. The ICAC has the power to detect and investigate corruption and money-laundering offenses and can also confiscate the proceeds of corruption and money laundering. Corruption is not seen as an obstacle to foreign direct investment.  Mauritius ranks 45th out of 168 countries in Transparency International’s Corruption Perceptions Index for 2015. Mauritius is one of Africa's least corrupt countries.

High levels of equitable public investment 
Mauritius has a strong human capital foundation developed through consistent and equitable investment in human development. This enabled Mauritius to exploit advantages, learn from expertise brought in through FDI and maintain competitiveness in a fast evolving international market. Education and health services are free and have been expanded in recent years, in order to create further employment opportunities and ensuring inclusive growth. The educated and adaptable workforce were essential elements of 1980s export-orientated growth. Around 90% of entrepreneurs in the export processing zone (EPZ) and in the manufacturing sector were eventually Mauritian nationals, businesspeople had the human capital, education and knowledge needed to exploit market opportunities.  According to the Government of Mauritius the general outlook for the manufacturing sector is positive, as the country offers many opportunities to entrepreneurs across the various value chains but insufficient skilled labour and limited research and development will remain impediments to potentially higher growth in this sector.

Financial services
Mauritius provides an environment for banks, insurance and reinsurance companies, captive insurance managers, trading companies, ship owners or managers, fund managers and professionals to conduct their international business. The economic success achieved in the 1980s engendered the rapid growth of the financial services sector in Mauritius. The following types of offshore activities can be conducted in Mauritius:
 Offshore Banking
 Offshore Insurance
 Offshore Funds Management
 International Financial Services
 Operational Headquarters
 International Consultancy Services
 Shipping and Ship Management
 Aircraft Financing and Leasing
 International Licensing and Franchising
 International Data Processing and Information Technology Services
 Offshore Pension Funds
 International Trading
 International Assets Management

Information and communication technology 
Since 2002, Mauritius has invested heavily into the development of an hub in information and communication technology (ICT). The contribution of the ICT sector accounts for 5.7% of the GDP. The ICT Sector employs 15,390 people. In 2016, two students from Mauritius became finalists in Google Code-in. In 2017, Mauritius got its first grand prize winner. In 2012, Mauritius participated for the first time in Google Summer of Code. In 2018, the cyberstorm.mu team from Mauritius led three tracks during the Internet Engineering Task Force Hackathon in Bangkok. As from 2016 Mauritius is organizing Hackathon and coding competiions such as Krakathon and the Webcup. Mauritius is one of the few countries which has participated in the development of post quantum cryptography.

International employment services

Macroeconomic statistics

Household income or consumption by percentage share:

Distribution of family income – Gini index:   39 (2006 estimate)

Agriculture – products:   sugarcane, tea, corn, potatoes, bananas, pulses; cattle, goats; fish

Industrial production growth rate:    8% (2000 estimate)

Electricity – production:    1,836 GWh (2002)

Electricity – consumption:    1,707 GWh (2002)

Oil – consumption:    (2003 estimate)
                       (2001 estimate)

Current account balance: $1,339 million (2011 estimate)
                          $799.4 million (2010 estimate)

Reserves of foreign exchange and gold:    $2,797 billion (2012 estimate)
$2,601 billion (2010 estimate)

2013 Index of Economic Freedom rank = 8thExchange rates''':   Mauritian rupees per US dollar – 30.12 (26 March 2014), 30.99 (1 February 2010), 32.86 (2006), 29.14 (2005), 27.50 (2004), 27.90 (2003), 29.96 (2002), 29.13 (2001)

See also
 Board of Investment (Mauritius)
 Bank of Mauritius (central bank)
 Mineral industry of Mauritius
 United Nations Economic Commission for Africa

Notes and references

External links
 
 Ministry Of Finance and Economic Development
 Central Statistics Office - Official gatherer and provider of statistics for Mauritius

 
African Union member economies
Mauritius